Chaghakhor Rural District is in Boldaji District of Borujen County, Chaharmahal and Bakhtiari province, Iran. At the census of 2006, its population was 8,119 in 1,743 households; there were 6,139 inhabitants in 1,550 households at the following census of 2011; and in the most recent census of 2016, the population of the rural district was 5,216 in 1,517 households. The largest of its 10 villages was Avargan, with 2,041 people.

References 

Borujen County

Rural Districts of Chaharmahal and Bakhtiari Province

Populated places in Chaharmahal and Bakhtiari Province

Populated places in Borujen County